Francesca Jaynes (born 12 October 1958) is an English choreographer and movement director who works in many disciplines within the entertainment industry, including feature films, theatre and commercials.

Early career 

Jaynes trained at the Bush Davies School of Theatre Arts, and danced professionally for several years before suffering a serious injury that led to a transition into choreography.  Following several years choreographing musical stage acts, she began working in UK television in 1982 and a career in film began in 1999 with Mike Leigh's Topsy-Turvy, earning her a nomination in the American Choreography Awards.

Film and television 

Jaynes' work in feature film covers a period of three decades and multiple genres, including costume drama (The Duchess, Great Expectations), family (Dumbo, Muppets Most Wanted, Charlie and the Chocolate Factory), science fiction (Gravity, A.I. Artificial Intelligence), fantasy (Avengers: Age of Ultron, Clash of the Titans), and music-based drama (De-Lovely, Topsy-Turvy).  She has worked with many of Hollywood's most prominent directors, including Joss Whedon, James Bobin, Robert Zemeckis, Mike Newell, Tim Burton, Steven Spielberg, and Mike Leigh, as well as a number of the industry's top actors, among them Andy Serkis, Sandra Bullock, Christoph Waltz, Tina Fey, Ray Liotta, Jude Law, Jack Black, Johnny Depp, Keira Knightley, Kevin Kline, Steve Whitmire (Kermit the Frog) and Eric Jacobson (Miss Piggy).

Her television credits include work with Judi Dench and Dustin Hoffman in Roald Dahl's Esio Trot for the BBC, as well as programmes such as Quiz by James Graham, Foyle's War, Agatha Christie's Marple, The Virgin Queen, and Tipping the Velvet.

Film and television credits

Theatre 

Jaynes began choreographing for theatre in the late 1980s, and continues to work regularly in this discipline.  In 2015 it was announced that she would be working with Mike Leigh on The Pirates of Penzance for the English National Opera.

Her work has been created for a wide range of theatres including the New Wolsey Theatre (Ipswich), Salisbury Playhouse, Birmingham Rep, Holland Park Opera, Stafford Festival Shakespeare, The Old Vic (London) and The National Theatre (London).

Jaynes has collaborated for more than 20 years with Director Peter Rowe on shows including Blues in the Night, Little Shop of Horrors, Guys and Dolls, and It's a Wonderful Life.

Theatre credits

Commercials 

Jaynes' choreographic and movement work has been seen in commercials for numerous major brands, both national and international.  The 2018 "Back to the Fuchsia" campaign for Ted Baker was choreographed by Jaynes, inspired by the song Think Pink from the musical Funny Face.  In 2014, she choreographed a sequence in "The Gentleman's Wager", a six-minute ad for Johnnie Walker Blue Label starring Jude Law and Giancarlo Giannini which premiered at the Venice Film Festival. SmartWater, Lynx, Sainsbury's, and Scottish Widows are amongst the other brands whose commercials have featured her work.

Short films 

In addition to her work as a choreographer and movement director, Jaynes has also created work as a writer/director of short films.  Her first film, For George, was completed in 2012, and was an Official Selection at the United Film Festival (London, UK), Festival Filmets (Badalona, Spain), and Best Actors Film Festival (San Francisco, USA), where it won the award for "Best Ensemble Cast in a Short Drama".

Her second short film, Gnomeland, was completed in 2013, and was chosen as an Official Selection at the Two Short Nights Film Festival (Exeter, UK) and the Deep Fried Film Festival (Lanarkshire, UK).

References

External links
 Official Website
 
 Francesca Jaynes at New York Times Movies and TV

1958 births
Living people
English women choreographers